Mitchell Goggins (1850 - ?) was a state legislator in South Carolina. He represented Abbeville County, South Carolina in the South Carolina House of Representatives from 1870 to 1872 and 1874 to 1876.

Columbus Goggins was his father.

See also
African-American officeholders during and following the Reconstruction era

References

1850 births
People from Abbeville County, South Carolina
African-American politicians during the Reconstruction Era
Year of death missing
African-American state legislators in South Carolina
Members of the South Carolina House of Representatives